Hooley or Hoolie is a surname. Notable people with the surname include:

 Christopher Hooley (1928–2018), British mathematician
 Darlene Hooley (born 1939), American politician
 E. Purnell Hooley (1860–1942), Welsh inventor
 E. T. Hooley (1842–1903), explorer, pastoralist and politician in Western Australia
 Ernest Terah Hooley (1859–1947), English and financier and business promoter
 Frank Hooley (1923–2015), British politician
 Teresa Hooley (1888–1973), English poet
 Peter Hooley (born 1992), Australian basketball player
 Terri Hooley (born 1948), Northern Irish record label owner
 Reginald Hooley (1865–1923) English amateur paleontologist
 Richard M. Hooley (1822–1893), American theatrical manager

Other people 

 Jim "Hoolie" DeCaire of Da Yoopers

Fictional characters 

 Miss Hoolie, a character from the British children's television programme Balamory, portrayed by Julie Wilson Nimmo

See also
 Holey (disambiguation)
Hoole (surname)
 Sylvester Ahola (1902–1995), American jazz trumpeter, nicknamed "Hooley"

Surnames
Surnames of British Isles origin
Surnames of English origin
Surnames of Scottish origin
Surnames of Welsh origin
English-language surnames